Harriet "Hatti" Archer (née Dean; born 2 February 1982) is a British long-distance runner who competes in cross country and steeplechase. She set three British national records in the 3000 metres steeplechase in 2007, most notably at a rain soaked event at Don Valley Stadium in July of that year. She competed at five World Cross Country Championships between 2005 and 2011, with her best result being 15th in Mombasa in 2007. She finished in the top ten at the European Cross Country Championships in 2008 (8th) and 2010 (7th), an event at which she has also won four team medals.

Archer earned selection in the 3000 metres steeplechase for the 2008 Olympic Games in Beijing, but was unable to compete due to a stress fracture to her ankle. In July 2010, she ran in the 3000 metres steeplechase at the European Championships in Barcelona, finishing fourth in the final in a time of 9:30.19, eight seconds quicker than her previous best.

Marta Domínguez, who finished second in the race was disqualified in November 2015 due to doping offences, handed a three-year ban and stripped of all medals and results achieved between August 5, 2009, and July 8, 2013.

Yuliya Zaripova of Russia who won the race in Barcelona, and went on to win world and Olympic titles in 2011 and 2012, was also subsequently handed a doping suspension. Third finisher, Lyubov Kharlamova of Russia, also served a two-year ban after testing positive in 2006.

Archer was upgraded to the bronze medal, with Kharlamova promoted to silver, after second-place finisher Domínguez was disqualified in November 2015.

Archer was further upgraded to the silver medal after Kharlamova was disqualified in August 2017. The silver medal for Archer represented the best British result in the history of the event.

She represented Great Britain in the World Mountain Running Championships in 2016, finishing in tenth place.

Personal life
Born Harriet Emily Dean in Oxford, England, Archer was educated at the Dragon School and St Helen and St Katharine School in Abingdon, Oxfordshire. She married fellow distance runner Dave Archer in 2012. They have a daughter, born in 2014, and a son, born in 2017.

Personal bests
1500 m: 4:16.57
3000 m: 8:58.77
3000 m steeplechase: 9:30.19
5000 m: 16:06.53
10,000 m: 33.31.76
10 km road: 33:28

National titles
2006 UK national 3000 metres steeplechase champion (2nd in 2010, 2012)
2009 English national cross country champion (2nd in 2011, 3rd in 2010)
Note: The 2006 UK Championships and AAAs of England Championships were incorporated into one event.

International competitions
All non-cross-country results are at 3000 metres steeplechase.

Note: In the European Cross Country Championships listed above, Archer has won four team medals, three silver (07,08,10) and one gold (2011).

References

External links 
 

1982 births
Living people
Sportspeople from Oxford
English female steeplechase runners
British female steeplechase runners
English female long-distance runners
British female long-distance runners
World Athletics Championships athletes for Great Britain
People educated at the School of St Helen and St Katharine
British female mountain runners
European Athletics Championships medalists
AAA Championships winners